Gladiolus imbricatus  is a Gladiolus species.

Species is found Central and East Europe, also in the countries of Mediterranean Sea, and Caucasus, Western Siberia.

References

External links

imbricatus